Lam Thap is a district (amphoe) of Krabi province, southern Thailand.

History
The minor district (king amphoe) Lam Thap was established on 30 June 1984, when the two tambons Lam Thap and Din Udom were split off from Khlong Thom district. It was upgraded to a full district on 4 November 1993.

Geography
Neighboring districts are (from the west clockwise): Khlong Thom and Khao Phanom of Krabi Province; Thung Yai and Bang Khan of Nakhon Si Thammarat province; and Wang Wiset of Trang province.

Administration
The district is divided into four sub-districts (tambons), which are further subdivided into 27 villages (mubans). Lam Thap is a township (thesaban tambon) and covers parts of tambons Lam Thap and Thung Sai Thong. There are a further four tambon administrative organizations (TAO).

References

External links
amphoe.com

Districts of Krabi province